Jo-Wilfried Tsonga defeated Roger Federer in the final, 7–5, 7–6(7–3) to win the men's singles tennis title at the 2014 Canadian Open. Tsonga became the first man to defeat Novak Djokovic, Andy Murray, and Federer in the same tournament since Rafael Nadal at the 2008 Hamburg Masters.

Rafael Nadal was the reigning champion, but withdrew due to a right-wrist injury.

Seeds
The top eight seeds receive a bye into the second round.

 Novak Djokovic (third round)
 Roger Federer (final)
 Stan Wawrinka (third round)
 Tomáš Berdych (third round)
 David Ferrer (quarterfinals)
 Milos Raonic (quarterfinals)
 Grigor Dimitrov (semifinals)
 Andy Murray (quarterfinals)
  (withdrew because of a right foot injury)
 John Isner (first round)
 Ernests Gulbis (second round)
  Richard Gasquet (third round, withdrew because of an abdominal strain)
 Jo-Wilfried Tsonga (champion)
 Roberto Bautista Agut (first round)
 Marin Čilić (third round)
 Fabio Fognini (second round)
 Tommy Robredo (third round)

Draw

Finals

Top half

Section 1

Section 2

Bottom half

Section 3

Section 4

Qualifying

Seeds

 Marinko Matosevic (qualifying competition, retired)
 Benjamin Becker (first round)
 Bernard Tomic (qualified)
 Tobias Kamke (qualified)
 Matthew Ebden (first round)
 Benoît Paire (qualified)
 Tim Smyczek (qualified)
 Malek Jaziri (qualifying competition,  lucky loser)
 Yūichi Sugita (qualifying competition)
 Michael Russell (qualified)
 James Duckworth (qualifying competition)
 Vincent Millot (qualifying competition)
 Michaël Llodra (qualifying competition)
 Thanasi Kokkinakis (qualified)

Qualifiers

Lucky losers
 
  Malek Jaziri

Qualifying draw

First qualifier

Second qualifier

Third qualifier

Fourth qualifier

Fifth qualifier

Sixth qualifier

Seventh qualifier

References
General

Specific

Rogers Cup
2014 Rogers Cup